Desmanthus is a genus of flowering plants in the mimosoid clade of the subfamily Caesalpinioideae of the pea family, Fabaceae. The name is derived from the Greek words δεσμός (desmos), meaning "bundle", and ἄνθος (anthos), meaning "flower". It contains about 24 species of herbs and shrubs that are sometimes described as being suffruiticose and have bipinnate leaves. Desmanthus is closely related to Leucaena and in appearance is similar to Neptunia. Like Mimosa and Neptunia, Desmanthus species fold their leaves in the evening. They are native to Mexico and North, Central and South America.  Members of the genus are commonly known as bundleflowers.  Donkey beans is another common name and originated in Central America, where Desmanthus species are highly regarded as fodder for these domestic draught animals.

Description

There are considerable differences in the descriptions of Desmanthus in the literature (see Bogdan 1977; Skerman 1977; National Academy of Science 1979; Allen & Allen 1981; Reid 1983; Hacker 1990). For example, Reid (1983) says that Desmanthus virgatus ranges from "leggy" plants in the humid tropics to compact bushes in the semi-arid zones to prostrate in the montane zones; Allen and Allen (1981) state that Desmanthus grows to 3 metres; Hacker (1990) states that D. virgatus is an erect shrub 1.3 metres tall. All these views illustrate the great diversity and polymorphism within the genus and between species.

Phytochemistry
The root-bark of D. illinoensis, which accounts for half of the total weight of the root system, is reported to contain anywhere from 0 to 0.34% DMT and 0.11% N-Methyltryptamine.  Alkaloid content is highly variable in this species.

Likewise, root bark of Desmanthus leptolobus has been found to contain N,N-DMT and related tryptamines. While its only reported quantitative analysis was 0.14% (Appleseed), all instances of co-occurrence with D. illinoensis showed it to be noticeably stronger than D. illinoensis, according to co-thin layer chromatography of the root bark.

Uses
During the 1990s in Australia, three species of Desmanthus were released as  pasture legumes and many other accessions are being evaluated as pasture species for clay soils. The three old released cultivars are:
 Desmanthus virgatus Cultivar "Marc"(Accession number: CPI 78373) which is described as early flowering, decumbent to ascending, growing 30 to 60 cm tall and originates from Argentina.
 Desmanthus leptophyllus Cultivar "Bayamo" (CPI 82285), mid season flowering, ascending type, 95–135 cm tall, from Cuba
 Desmanthus pubescens Cultivar "Uman" (CPI 92803), late flowering, decumbent shrub, taller and wider spreading than Marc, 40–100 cm tall, from Mexico.
Of these three, only the cultivar Marc is still commercially available. 
In 2015 five new cultivars of Desmanthus named JCU 1 to JCU 5 have been granted PBR and are commercially available as a blend named "Progardes", consisting of D. bicornutus, D. leptophyllus and D. virgatus, these have been developed in Queensland Australia as a pasture legume for semi-arid tropical/subtropical alkaline clay soils.  Progardes became available in 2013 in Northern Australia and some 35,000 to 50,000  ha has been already sown into native and buffelgrass pasture. In recent times additional cultivars have seen developed including cv JCU 6,7,8 and 9. These can also be included in the Progardes blend. The breeding of intraspecific and interspecific crosses are well advanced. In terms of animal production Progardes has been to shown to enhance beef production.

In its native range in the United States, the Land Institute is selectively breeding the widely distributed Illinois bundleflower (Desmanthus illinoensis) to be a perennial seed crop for human food, in addition to forage / pasture.  It offers many of the advantages  in terms of nutrition, protein and nitrogen fixation as soybeans or alfalfa, but as a perennial.  Perennial crops tend to require less input of chemicals and energy, and less weed control, for comparable or higher yields to annuals in many systems.

Species

See also
 Psychedelic plants

References

External links

Fodder
Mimosoids
Fabaceae genera